Goręczyno  It lies approximately  south-west of Somonino,  south of Kartuzy, and  west of the regional capital Gdańsk. It is located in the ethnocultural region of Kashubia in the historic region of Pomerania.

The village has a population of 1,300.

History
During the German occupation of Poland (World War II), the local forest was the site of a massacre of Poles committed by the Germans on October 29, 1939 as part of the Intelligenzaktion. Poles from Goręczyno were also among the victims of massacres of Poles, committed by the Germans in nearby Kaliska in October and November 1939, while local priest Wacław Kuc was murdered during a massacre of Polish priests from the region perpetrated by the Einsatzkommando 16 in the forest near Kartuzy. In 1941, the occupiers also carried out expulsions of Poles, whose houses were then handed over to German colonists as part of the Lebensraum policy.

Sports
The local football club is Gryf Goręczyno. It competes in the lower leagues.

Notable people

 Alfons Flisykowski (1902–1939), Polish postal worker, second commander of the Defence of the Polish Post Office in Gdańsk during the German invasion of Poland

References

Villages in Kartuzy County
Nazi war crimes in Poland